Chessy, also known as Chessy-les-Mines, is a commune in the Rhône department in eastern France.

Chessy-les-Mines is the type locality of the mineral azurite, also known as "chessylite." The species was  redescribed and renamed in 1824 by François-Sulpice Beudant (1787–1850), French mineralogist and geologist.

See also
Communes of the Rhône department

References

External links

Photo gallery of Chessy mines & minerals
Photo of a classic Chessy azurite at Muséum national d'histoire naturelle

Communes of Rhône (department)
Rhône communes articles needing translation from French Wikipedia